Nazario Nazari (1724 – after 1793) was an Italian painter, active in a late-Baroque or Rococo style, in and around Venice. Nazario was well known as a portraitist of aristocratic officials of the Republic of Venice.

Early life 
He was born in Clusone, the son and pupil of the painter Bartolomeo Nazari; his sister Maria was also active as a painter. He was active in Bergamo from 1750–1755. He was then sent to Venice, because his father wished to separate him from bad company. Among his portraits, were those of Elena Bresciani, Antonio Roncalli, Countess Maria Olimpia Coleoni, and in 1755 Signor Bartolomeo Vitalba. In 1755, traveled to Genoa with his father.

References

1724 births
1790s deaths
18th-century Italian painters
Italian male painters
Italian neoclassical painters
Painters from Bergamo
Painters from Venice
People from Clusone
18th-century Italian male artists